Mammary artery may refer to:
 the internal thoracic artery (previously known as the internal mammary artery)
The internal thoracic artery is commonly chosen as a graft artery during coronary artery bypass graft surgery. 
 the lateral thoracic artery (previously known as the external mammary artery)